When Love Speaks is a compilation album that features interpretations of William Shakespeare's sonnets – some spoken, some set to music – and excerpts from his plays by famous actors and musicians, released under EMI Classics in April 2002. The title alludes to a speech in Love's Labour's Lost – "And when love speaks, the voice of all the gods make heaven drowsy with the harmony." – which is, however, not on the album.

Alan Rickman proposed the idea for a benefit album for the Royal Academy of Dramatic Art – where most of the featured actors on this album had studied – and together with Richard Attenborough and Michael Kamen backed it and recruited artists to participate. The launch took place at The Old Vic.

Track listing
"Be not afeard, the isle is full of noises" (from The Tempest – Act III, Scene II), performed by Joseph Fiennes
"Live With Me and Be My Love" (from The Passionate Shepherd to His Love, Christopher Marlowe), set to music and sung by Annie Lennox
"As an unperfect actor on the stage" ("Sonnet 23"), performed by John Gielgud
"My mistress' eyes are nothing like the sun" ("Sonnet 130"), performed by Alan Rickman
"Why is my verse so barren of new pride" ("Sonnet 76"), performed by Diana Rigg
"Who will believe my verse in time to come" ("Sonnet 17"), performed by Richard Attenborough
"That you were once unkind befriends me now" ("Sonnet 120"), performed by Paul Rhys
"How oft, when thou, my music" ("Sonnet 128"), performed by Juliet Stevenson
"When, in disgrace with fortune and men's eyes" ("Sonnet 29"), set to music and sung by Rufus Wainwright
"Being your slave, what should I do but tend" ("Sonnet 57"), performed by Janet McTeer
"Tired with all these, for restful death I cry" ("Sonnet 66"), performed by Alan Bates
"When I consider everything that grows" ("Sonnet 15"), performed by Marianne Jean-Baptiste
"Let those who are in favour with their stars" ("Sonnet 25"), performed by David Warner
"They that have power to hurt and will do none" ("Sonnet 94"), performed by Siân Phillips
"Those lips that Love's own hand did make" ("Sonnet 145"), performed by John Hurt
"Come again, sweet love doth now invite" (John Dowland) sung by John Potter
"Th'expense of spirit in a waste of shame" ("Sonnet 129"), performed by Ralph Fiennes
"Thine eyes I love, and they, as pitying me" ("Sonnet 132"), performed by Matthew Rhys
"I never saw that you did painting need" ("Sonnet 83"), performed by Imelda Staunton
"When to the sessions of sweet silent thought" ("Sonnet 30"), performed by Kenneth Branagh
"Is it thy will thy image should keep open" ("Sonnet 61"), performed by Fiona Shaw
"Mine eye and heart are at a mortal war" ("Sonnet 46"), performed by Henry Goodman
"No more be grieved at that which thou hast done" ("Sonnet 35"), set to music and sung by Keb' Mo'
"O never say that I was false of heart" ("Sonnet 109"), performed by Susannah York
"Look in thy glass and tell the face thou viewest" ("Sonnet 3"), performed by Timothy Spall
"Some glory in their birth, some in their skill" ("Sonnet 91"), performed by Peter Barkworth
"How heavy do I journey on the way" ("Sonnet 50"), performed by Gemma Jones
"Since brass, nor stone, nor earth, nor boundless sea" ("Sonnet 65"), performed by Jonathan Pryce
"Like as the waves make towards the pebbled shore" ("Sonnet 60"), performed by Richard Wilson
"The quality of mercy is not strained" (from The Merchant of Venice – Act IV, Scene I), set to music and sung by Des'ree
"Sweet love, renew thy force; be it not said" ("Sonnet 56"), performed by Tom Courtenay
"Since I left you, mine eye is in my mind" ("Sonnet 113"), performed by Zoe Waites
"Be wise as thou art cruel; do not press" ("Sonnet 140"), performed by Edward Fox
"Is it for fear to wet a widow's eye" ("Sonnet 9"), performed by Trevor Eve
"So it is not with me as with that Muse" ("Sonnet 21"), performed by Imogen Stubbs
"Devouring Time, blunt thou the lion's paws" ("Sonnet 19"), performed by David Harewood
"The Willow Song" (from Othello – Act IV, Scene III), sung by Barbara Bonney
"When my love swears that she is made of truth" ("Sonnet 138"), performed by Richard Johnson
"When I do count the clock that tells the time" ("Sonnet 12"), performed by Martin Jarvis
"What potions have I drunk of siren tears" ("Sonnet 119"), performed by Roger Hammond
"Not marble nor the gilded monuments" ("Sonnet 55"), performed by Richard Briers
"Sin of self-love possesseth all mine eye" ("Sonnet 62"), performed by John Sessions
"Let me not to the marriage of true minds" ("Sonnet 116"), performed by Thelma Holt
"Music to hear, why hearst thou music sadly" ("Sonnet 8"), set to music by Joseph Shabalala and sung by Ladysmith Black Mambazo
"When forty winters shall besiege thy brow" ("Sonnet 2"), performed by Caroline Blakiston
"No longer mourn for me when I am dead" ("Sonnet 71"), performed by Peter Bowles
"In faith, I do not love thee with mine eyes" ("Sonnet 141"), performed by Sylvia Syms
"Why didst thou promise such a beauteous day" ("Sonnet 34"), performed by Robert Lindsay
"Not from the stars do I my judgement pluck" ("Sonnet 14"), performed by Ioan Gruffudd
"My love is as a fever, longing still" ("Sonnet 147"), performed by John Hurt
"The little Love-God lying once asleep" ("Sonnet 154"), performed by Bohdan Poraj
"Shall I compare thee to a summer's day" ("Sonnet 18"), sung by Bryan Ferry
"Our revels are now ended" (from The Tempest – Act IV, Scene I), performed by Joseph Fiennes

Personnel

Actors

 Peter Barkworth
 Alan Bates
 Kenneth Branagh
 Tom Courtenay
 Trevor Eve
 Joseph Fiennes
 Ralph Fiennes
 Edward Fox
 Sir John Gielgud
 Henry Goodman
 John Hurt
 Bohdan Poraj
 Jonathan Pryce
 Alan Rickman
 Diana Rigg
 Imelda Staunton
 Juliet Stevenson
 Richard Wilson
 Zoe Waites
 David Warner

Musicians

 Barbara Bonney – soprano
 Caroline Dale – cello
 Des'ree – voice
 Bryan Ferry – voice
 Charles Green – clarinet
 Barry Guy – baroque violin
 Maya Homburger – soprano saxophone
 Michael Kamen – piano, arranger, composer, conductor, producer, liner notes, executive producer, string arrangements
 Keb' Mo' – voice
 Ladysmith Black Mambazo – voice
 Annie Lennox – voice
 Anna McGarrigle – accordion
 Kate McGarrigle – banjo
 Michel Pépin – bass, guitar, producer, engineer, mixing
 John Potter – voice
 John Surman – tenor saxophone
 Stephen Stubbs – lute
 Gillian Tingay – harp
 Matthew Wadsworth – lute
 Rufus Wainwright – piano, vocals, composer, producer
 Joel Zifkin – violin

Production

 Tony Bridge – mastering
 Tim Atack – mixing
 James Brett – producer, engineer, mixing
 Joseph Shabalala – arranger, producer
 Geoff Foster – engineer
 Martin Jarvis – engineer
 Anthony (Tony) Fisher – engineer
 Brian Tench – engineer
 Ned Douglas – engineer
 Robert Lindsay – engineer
 Don Murnaghan – engineer, mixing
 Iain Roberton – engineer, mixing
 Mark Johnson – engineer, mixing
 Stephen McLaughlin – engineer, mixing
 Ash Howes – mixing
 Ricky Graham – mixing
 Peter Cobbin – pre-mastering

Producers

 Richard Attenborough – liner notes
 Nicholas Barter – liner notes
 Andrew Brown
 Des'ree
 Manfred Eicher
 Bryan Ferry
 Annie Lennox
 Robin Trower
 Alan Rickman
 Prince Sampson

References

External links
 

2002 compilation albums
2000s spoken word albums
EMI Classics albums
Music based on works by William Shakespeare
Tribute albums to non-musicians